Ragged Isle is a Maine-based dramatic web series that has won multiple Indie Series Awards and other accolades.

History 
"Ragged Isle" was created by the husband-and-wife team of Barry Dodd and Karen L. Dodd as a project for their production company, The Entertainment Experiment.  The story was conceived by Greg Tulonen, Barry Dodd, Karen L. Dodd, Rick Dalton, and Jacob Lear, with episodes directed by Barry Dodd.  It was shot in the summers of 2010 and 2011, entirely on location in Maine, featuring an all-Maine cast and crew.

The project's origins date back to 2007, when the Dodds collaborated with a group of University of Southern Maine actors to enter the College Soap Opera Contest, sponsored by SOAPnet.  Their entry, "Criehaven," a melodrama set on a mysterious Maine island, placed in the top five in the nation.  Three years later, the couple would revisit the concept for a new project, now called "Ragged Isle."
 
The Dodds are fans of Dark Shadows, hence some similarities and references to the '60s gothic soap opera.

Premise 
Young journalism school graduate Vicki Burke has just landed a job at a newspaper on the quiet Maine island of Ragged Isle. She is soon caught up in a mystery involving several deaths by drowning, though the victims' bodies are discovered nowhere near the water, their clothes completely dry.  The solution to the puzzle may uncover secrets that have been kept on the island for generations.

Production
Season one of "Ragged Isle" (10 episodes out of a planned 22) was written by Greg Tulonen, Barry Dodd, Karen L. Dodd, Rick Dalton, and Jacob Lear, and was shot at various Maine locations during the summer of 2010. The first episode premiered online on March 9, 2011, with new episodes released each week until the season finale aired on May 11, 2011.

On February 1, 2012, the first season relaunched on the entertainment network web site The SFN, home of other notable web series, including California Heaven, River Ridge, and AIDAN 5, among others.

Scripts for seasons two and three (six episodes each) were written by Greg Tulonen, based on a story by Greg Tulonen, Barry Dodd, Karen L. Dodd, Rick Dalton, and Jacob Lear.  Both seasons were shot in the summer of 2011.

Season two premiered May 29, 2012 on raggedisle.com, with new episodes released every other week.

The world premiere of its third and final season screened at the Raindance Film Festival Web Fest in London in September 2013 and debuted online on October 31, 2013.

The twenty-second episode (and series finale) debuted at the Alamo Theatre in Bucksport, Maine on October 18, 2014 as part of the 2014 Ghostport Festival. The finale made its online debut on October 31, 2014.

Setting
Ragged Isle is small island lobstering community that lies 21 miles off the coast of Maine.  It is a highly fictionalized version of the real-life Maine island of Criehaven.

Cast and characters 
Brent Askari as Gus Hendershot, who owns the Island Grocer, a central hub of all activity on Ragged Isle.  If you want to know what's going on with someone on the island, Gus is a good man to ask.
Meghan Benton as Vicki Burke, a recent college graduate embarking on a new career in journalism on Ragged Isle, a remote fishing community off the coast of Maine.
Ian Carlsen as Paul Soucey, the captain of a Ragged Isle lobstering vessel manned by a crew of his three closest friends. They make the grave mistake of fishing in the island's "restricted zone," possibly setting off a devastating chain of events.
Sebastian Carlsen as Sebastian Carlsen (a.k.a. "Sea Bass"), the clerk at the Island Grocer and amateur stand-up comic.
Kathryn Coccyx as Madame Clelia.  Some people on Ragged Isle call her the Island Witch, while others think she's just a harmless eccentric. Either way, most islanders steer clear of her. But it is she more than anyone on the island who may have the powers and foresight to rescue them all.
Adam Cogswell as Louis Gilbert, a nervous, superstitious fellow, who regularly visits Madame Clelia for spiritual guidance. He's perhaps a surprising choice to be Harrison Shaw's protégé, but Shaw hand-picked Louis himself, grooming the young man to take over for him "when the time comes."
Cathy Counts as Dr. Gail Monroe, Ragged Isle's only resident doctor, with a private practice out of her home.  Her patient list includes every resident of Ragged Isle.
Rick Dalton as Sheriff Dalton, who grew up on Ragged Isle, and continues to call the island his home. As the island's sole resident lawman, he takes it upon himself to the lead the investigation into all the island's crimes, small and large.
Denis Fontaine as Vance Trundle, who for the past 15 years has been editor and sole employee of island's newspaper, The Ragged Isle Star. He may sometimes seem scattered and disorganized, but he's actually a sharp newspaperman and something of a muckraker, using the paper to champion the working man and skewer the establishment.
Dominic Lavoie as Mac, the third man on Paul Soucey's lobstering crew.  Mac is loud, outgoing, and gregarious, with a juvenile sense of humor and somewhat poor impulse control, which may just get him into trouble one of these days.
Todd Manter as Harrison Shaw.  While it has been said that lobstermen do not have bosses, all the lobstermen of Ragged Isle must work in the shadow of Harrison Shaw, who has exclusive deals with every seafood distributor on the mainland. Shaw wields his power with a stern hand. He has a quick temper and a long memory, and lobstermen know better than to cross him.
Christine Louise Marshall as Colleen Drake, Ragged Isle's head librarian.  Residents know better than to let their books become overdue, lest they earn a stern stare from a somewhat humorless Drake.
Amie Marzen as Julie Katsarakis, newly elected chairwoman of the island council, a young woman filled with energy and optimism. She is inseparable from her closest confidante and mentor, Rose Fuller, whom she thinks of as a second mother.
Erik Moody as Deputy Dan Therrien, a driven young lawman who is called to Ragged Isle by Sheriff Dalton to help investigate a baffling murder case on the island.
Kathryn Perry as Allison Thorne, an agent with the Department of Homeland Security, who has been entrusted with considerable authority and power, and has a cadre of agents under her command.
Doug Porter as "Dirty" Bill, the final man on Paul's crew. He's more of a follower than a leader, looking to Eric or Paul for cues on what he should do. That may or may not be in his best interest.
April Joy Purninton as Rachel Moody, who runs the Ragged Isle watering hole The Glass Jaw. She has a very friendly relationship with Sheriff Dalton, whom she calls "Rick."
Suzanne Rankin as Gertie Kendrick, a reclusive, bestselling author who writes enormously popular novels about the early days of Maine's history.
Beth Saufler as Rose Fuller, a beloved figure on Ragged Isle, known for her gentle humor, her generosity, her good common sense, and her homemade pies.
Justin C. St. Louis as Trevor Stebbins, a young writer who has worked as an assistant to noted author Gertie Kendrick for the past several years.
Michael Dix Thomas as Eric Burke, Vicki's twin brother, who works on the crew of his best friend Paul's lobster boat. He and Vicki used to be inseparable, but they have drifted apart over the past four years, after she went to college and he moved to Ragged Isle.
Greg Tulonen as Dr. Brian Hoffman, who works for the Maine CDC investigating outbreaks of mysterious illnesses.  Having an avid interest in the paranormal, he also explores unexplained phenomenon around Maine.

Season 1

Season 2

Season 3

Soundtrack
The Ragged Isle soundtrack features exclusively Maine-based musicians and bands.  In the second season, musician Richard de Costa, who had contributed songs in season one, composed an original score for four of the six individual episodes.  He returned to score every episode of season three.  The first two seasons' soundtracks are available for purchase on the online music store Bandcamp, courtesy of Deporter Records, as is Richard deCosta's stand-alone score album, courtesy of Richard deCosta.

Awards

Won
 Best Director (Drama), Barry Dodd, 4th Annual Indie Series Awards
 Best Web Series (Drama), 3rd Annual Indie Series Awards
 Best Cinematography, Barry Dodd and Derek Kimball, 3rd Annual Indie Series Awards
 Best Director (Drama), Barry Dodd, 3rd Annual Indie Series Awards

Nominations 
 Best Special/Visual Effects, Richard DeCosta, Eric Anderson, and Derek Kimball, 6th Annual Indie Series Awards
 Best Original Score, Richard DeCosta, 6th Annual Indie Series Awards
 Best Soundtrack, Barry Dodd, 6th Annual Indie Series Awards
 Best Directing (Drama), Barry Dodd, 6th Annual Indie Series Awards
 Best Editing, Barry Dodd, 6th Annual Indie Series Awards
 Best Cinematography, Derek Kimball, David C. Miller, and Barry Dodd, 6th Annual Indie Series Awards
 Best Editing, Barry Dodd, 5th Annual Indie Series Awards
 Best Cinematography, David C. Miller and Derek Kimball, 5th Annual Indie Series Awards
 Best Web-Series, 2014 Horror Society Awards
 Grooviest Drama, 3rd Annual Groovy Awards
 Best Web Series (Drama), 4th Annual Indie Series Awards
 Best Supporting Actor (Drama), Ian Carlsen, 4th Annual Indie Series Awards
 Best Writing (Drama), Greg Tulonen, Barry Dodd, Karen L. Dodd, Rick Dalton, and Jacob Lear, 4th Annual Indie Series Awards
 Best Soundtrack, 4th Annual Indie Series Awards
 Best Editing, Barry Dodd, 4th Annual Indie Series Awards
 Best Visual/Special Effects, Eric Anderson, 4th Annual Indie Series Awards
 Best Actor (Drama), Rick Dalton, 3rd Annual Indie Series Awards
 Best Writing (Drama), Greg Tulonen, Barry Dodd, Karen L. Dodd, Rick Dalton, and Jacob Lear, 3rd Annual Indie Series Awards
 Best Ensemble (Drama), 3rd Annual Indie Series Awards
 Best Use of Music, 3rd Annual Indie Series Awards
 Fans' Choice, 3rd Annual Indie Series Awards

References

External links
 Ragged Isle Official Website

2011 web series debuts
2014 web series endings
Internet soap operas
American drama web series
Horror fiction web series
Thriller web series
Mystery drama web series